Borislav Apostolov (born ) is a Bulgarian male volleyball player. He is part of the Bulgaria men's national volleyball team winning the silver medal at the 2015 European Games in Baku. On club level he currently plays for Marek Union Ivkoni.

References

External links
 profile at FIVB.org

1990 births
Living people
Bulgarian men's volleyball players
Place of birth missing (living people)
Volleyball players at the 2015 European Games
European Games silver medalists for Bulgaria
European Games medalists in volleyball